The Black Forest Open is a tennis tournament held in Freudenstadt, Germany between 1999 and 2009 and in Alpirsbach, Germany between 1996 and 1998. The event is part of the ''challenger series and is played on outdoor clay courts.

Past finals

Singles

Doubles

External links 
 

 
ATP Challenger Tour
Clay court tennis tournaments
1999 establishments in Germany
Recurring sporting events established in 1999
Tennis tournaments in Germany